Stržišče is a settlement in the hills north of Hudajužna in the Municipality of Tolmin in the Littoral region of Slovenia.

The parish church in the settlement is dedicated to Saint Oswald and belongs to the Diocese of Koper.

References

External links
Stržišče on Geopedia

Populated places in the Municipality of Tolmin